The Audie Award for Business and Personal Development is one of the Audie Awards presented annually by the Audio Publishers Association (APA). It awards excellence in narration, production, and content for a business, educational, self-help, or motivational audiobook released in a given year.

Before 2016, this was given as two distinct awards: One was given from 2008 to 2015 as the Audie Award for Personal Development, from 2002 to 2007 as the Audie Award for Personal Development or Motivational Title, and from 1997 to 2001 as the Audie Award for Personal Development or Self-Help.

The other was given from 2008 to 2015 as the Audie Award for Business or Educational Title, and from 2002 to 2007 as the Audie Award for Business Information or Educational Title. Before 2002 this award itself was given as two distinct awards: One was given from 1999 to 2001 as the Audie Ward for Business Information, and from 1997 to 1998 as the Audie Award for Business.

The other was given from 2000 to 2001 as the Audie Award for Educational and Training Title, in 1999 as the Audie Award for Educational Title, and from 1996 to 1998 as the Audie Award for Educational, How-To, or Instructional Title.

Winners and finalists

2010s

2020s

Business winners and finalists 1996–2015

1990s

2000s

2010s

Personal Development winners and finalists 1997–2015

1990s

2000s

2010s

Education winners and finalists 1997–2001

1990s

2000s

References

External links 

 Audie Award winners
 Audie Awards official website

Business and Personal Development
Awards established in 1997
English-language literary awards